The  is a tilting DC electric multiple unit (EMU) train type introduced in 1973 by Japanese National Railways (JNR), and currently operated by West Japan Railway Company (JR-West), and formerly also operated by Central Japan Railway Company (JR Central) in Japan.

Fleet
, 136 vehicles were operated by JR-West.

Operations

JR Central
 Shinano (1973–May 2008)

JR-West
 Kuroshio (from October 1978 until 30 October 2015)
 Yakumo (from July 1982 to 2023)
 Kounotori (until 31 May 2011, from 1 June 2012 until 30 October 2015)
 Kinosaki (from 1 June 2012 until 30 October 2015)
 Hashidate (from 16 March 2013 until 30 October 2015)
 Hanwa Liner rapid service (until March 2011)
 Yamatoji Liner rapid service (until March 2011)

Livery variations

History
The 381 series EMU was developed from the experimental 591 series 3-car articulated tilting EMU tested from 1970.

Trainsets entered revenue service from 10 July 1973 on the Shinano limited express between Nagoya and Nagano.

JR-West 381 series trains were removed from Kuroshio, Kounotori, Kinosaki, and Hashidate limited express services in October 2015, with the last services operating on 30 October.

Preserved examples
 KuHa 381-1: (built 1973 by Kawasaki Heavy Industries) SCMaglev and Railway Park, Nagoya.
 KuRo 381-11: (built 1974 by Kawasaki Heavy Industries) formerly at the SCMaglev and Railway Park, Nagoya, removed in June 2019.
 KuRo 381-1104: (built 1978 by Kawasaki Heavy Industries) Suita Depot, Osaka.

Notes

References

Electric multiple units of Japan
Central Japan Railway Company
Tilting trains
Train-related introductions in 1973
Hitachi multiple units
Kawasaki multiple units
Kinki Sharyo multiple units
1500 V DC multiple units of Japan